Tor Andreas Haugerud (born 7 January 1962 in Brattvåg) is a Norwegian jazz musician (drums and percussion)
known from Transjoik, Blixband, BOL, Möster Trio, and has created his own avant-garde band "MisterYtor" ("Nordland Musikkfestuke", 2006).

Career
Haugerud is an experienced drummer and percussionist, living in Trondheim, Norway. As a musician, he has developed his own unconventional style based on improvised music influenced by the European contemporary music scene. He was involved in a production under "Trondheim Jazzfestival" (2005), and has contributed for "Cirka Teater", showing his background as a physical actor and performance artist in projects of surrealistic art, in groups like "Cirka Teater", "MisterYtor" and "Teater Fot", in which he also is a composer.
At "SoddJazz" 2006 he performed with Trio Alpaca, and is now a member of Alpaca Ensemble which has released the records Tapet Tapet and Elevator with music composed by Eirik Hegdal.

Haugerud is playing in the Jazz trio ÉnÉnÉn with Eirik Hegdal and Michael Francis Duch, and in the bands "Gibrish" and "Bengalo". In 2008 he joined the free improvisation group "Murmur"/Muringa comprising Kim Myhr, Martin Taxt, Klaus Holm in addition to Haugerud. He also plays the improvisation duo Vertex with Petter Vågan. They released the album Shapes & Phases (2010) at the label Sofa, followed by extensive touring in among other places Germany and the United States.

Haugerud is also a guest lecturer at the Music Performance Studies at the Trondheim Musikkonservatorium.

Discography
With Bol
Bol – (2001, Via Music)
Silver Sun – (2005, Curling Legs)
Skylab – (2007, NorCD)
Numb, Number – (2012, Gigafon)

With Transjoik
Uja Nami – (2004, Vuelie), nominated for the Spellemannprisen
Bewafá – (2005, Vuelie), with Sher Miandad Khan from Pakistan on vocals

With Trondheim Jazz Orchestra
We Are – (2005, Jazzaway Records), with Eirik HegdalLive in Oslo – (2007, MNJ Records), with Maria Kannegaard TrioWood And Water – (2008, MNJ Records), with Eirik HegdalStems And Cages – (2010, MNJ Records), with Kim MyhrMorning Songs – (2011, MNJ Records), with Per Zanussi

with Eirik Hegdal's Alpaca EnsembleTapet Tapet – (2007, Jazzaway Records)Elevatorwith Vertex Duo Petter VåganShapes & Phases – (2010, Sofa)

with ÉnÉnÉnRød & Blå – (2010, Øra Fonogram)

with MuringaThe Unknown Knowns'' – (2011, Sofa)

References

External links
 

20th-century Norwegian drummers
21st-century Norwegian drummers
Norwegian jazz drummers
Male drummers
Norwegian jazz composers
Male jazz composers
1962 births
Living people
20th-century drummers
20th-century Norwegian male musicians
21st-century Norwegian male musicians
Trondheim Jazz Orchestra members
BOL (band) members